The Deal LLC is a media company that offers The Deal Pipeline, a transaction information service, and formerly published finance and business magazine The Deal. The company generates original and daily articles, commentary and data that cover the world of finance and business through the lens of deal making, focusing on core areas including Mergers & Acquisitions, private equity, venture capital financings, bankruptcies and other topics of interest to the investment banking, private equity, legal, hedge fund and venture capital industries.

As of 2009 The Deal had more than 120 employees, including 70 full-time journalists based in the New York headquarters with bureaus across the U.S., London.

The roots of the media company began when The Daily Deal was launched in September 1999 by American Lawyer Media with strong support from  dealmaker Bruce Wasserstein. In March 2000, ALM sold the assets of the Deal to U.S. Equity Partners, a private equity fund sponsored by Wasserstein & Co. In December 2000, Rustic Canyon Ventures, a venture capital firm based in Southern California, led a $30 million venture round of financing. In 2012, The Deal was acquired by TheStreet.com, who closed the magazine. After being acquired by The Street, all publications of The Deal became digital and are still available today.

In 2018, TheStreet announced the sale of BoardEx and The Deal to Euromoney Institutional Investor.

Publications
The Deal LLC provides commentary, analysis and information services to Wall Street advisers, investors, financial intermediaries and corporate executives via web-based services:

The Deal Pipeline, a transaction information service
TheDeal.com, the corporate website of The Deal LLC
Corporate Control Alert, a journal of legal and financial trends in dealmaking

References

External links
The Deal website
"What's the Deal With the Daily Deal?" Fortune, November 22, 1999
"The Deal.com Drops Pay Model for Engagement", Circulation Management, June 18, 2008
"The Deal Newsweekly Site Opens Up Access to The Deal's Editorial Content", press release, June 16, 2008
"Wasserstein Cuts His Daily Deal".  The New York Observer, September 12, 1999.

Business magazines published in the United States
Weekly magazines published in the United States
Defunct magazines published in the United States
Magazines established in 1999
Magazines disestablished in 2012
Magazines published in New York City
Private equity media and publications
1999 establishments in New York City